Edward John Trombetta (died January 27, 2008) was an American politician. He served as a Democratic member for the 89th district of the Florida House of Representatives from 1970 to 1972.

Trombetta was originally from New York. He attended at the University of Notre Dame, and served in the United States Marine Corps. In 1970, Trombetta was elected for the 89th district of the Florida House of Representatives, succeeding Charles J. King. In 1972, Trombetta was succeeded by James Lorenzo Walker for the 89th district. He lived in Broward County, Florida before moving to Tallahassee, Florida in 1973.

Trombetta died in January 2008, at the age of 69.

References 

Year of birth missing
2008 deaths
Democratic Party members of the Florida House of Representatives
20th-century American politicians
University of Notre Dame alumni